Jason & the Scorchers, originally Jason & the Nashville Scorchers, are a cowpunk band that formed in 1981 and are led by singer-songwriter Jason Ringenberg.

With a sound that combines punk rock and country music, Jason and the Scorchers are noted for their energetic live performances, and have earned strong reviews from critics, including Mark Deming, who declared they "blazed a trail for the cowpunk and alt-country movements that followed in their wake."

Jason and the Scorchers have maintained a loyal core group of fans around the world for more than 30 years. Jason and the Scorchers released their latest album Halcyon Times in February 2010.

History

Early days
A native of Sheffield, Illinois, Ringenberg attended Southern Illinois University at Carbondale and was a member of a short-lived acoustic trio in 1978. In late 1979, Ringenberg formed his first band, Shakespeare's Riot, the precursor of the Scorchers. Named after an oblique reference to the Astor Place Riot, Shakespeare's Riot played Ringenberg's original compositions, rockabilly songs and other similar styled tunes by Bob Dylan and Tom Petty; adapted to his high-energy country rock style.

Ringenberg disbanded Shakespeare's Riot and moved to Nashville in 1981. He was introduced to his original Scorcher bandmates through the independent Praxis record label, and the group soon established a strong reputation among indie rock circles.

Although country rock and rockabilly were not new concepts, they predated the raw sound of 1970s punk and 1980s alternative rock, and by the early 1980s, most country music resembled mainstream pop with the appeal of the Urban Cowboy movement. Therefore, Jason and the Scorchers were something of a novelty in their hometown, Nashville, Tennessee, as their ragged, high-energy music was somewhat unprecedented.  This made The Scorchers a natural for eclectic venues such as Nashville's Exit/In.

Rock critic Jimmy Guterman reported that in late 1983, during a concert held "in the basement of a now-boarded Philadelphia dive...Jason Ringenberg balanced himself on a rickety stool...and wished aloud what he wanted his band to sound like. 'Like a religious service,' he said wistfully, 'only a lot dirtier.'"

Guterman would later report, <blockquote>"onstage, the early Scorchers...eschew[ed] all subtlety. [Drummer] Perry Baggs concentrated on destroying his snare with style, and [bassist] Jeff Johnson stood intent and rail-straight, an ideal foil for the two wild men up front...Guitarist Warner Hodges slid from delicate lap steel to Keith Richards-style guitar heroics without making one seem like a departure from the other. Whether he stood at the lip of the stage, leaning over the audience, sucking a cigarette, or he spun himself into speedy circles that would have made any mere mortal dizzy, Hodges personified the country boy too thrilled to be rocking to care how ridiculous he looked. The same went for Ringenberg. His own dancing during the rocking numbers suggested (The Honeymooners''') Ed Norton on methamphetamines, but when he strapped on his acoustic guitar and stood center stage, no one could argue that he wasn't haunted by the ghosts of Hank [Williams] and Lefty [Frizzell]."</blockquote>

Debut EP
The Scorchers released their debut, D.I.Y. EP, Reckless Country Soul, in 1982 on the independent Praxis label. Guterman would later write that it "captured the explosive band in its untutored infancy...Across its four terse, hilarious songs - full of rants against British hair bands [on 'Shot Down Again'], analyses of Jerry Falwell's shortcomings as a marriage counselor, and an irreverent homage to Hank Williams - the band was able to erect a sound that approximated nothing so much as Joe Strummer hurling a wrecking ball through the Grand Ole Opry. This was no joke."

 Fervor with EMI
EMI signed the Scorchers in 1983, and producer/engineer Terry Manning was brought on board. New tracks were recorded, and a second EP was released with the title Fervor. By now, the Scorchers were fairly popular as a live act, and rock critics from noted publications began to take notice. Robert Christgau praised Fervor in his "Consumer Guide" column, writing that "crossing Gram Parsons's knowledge of sin with Joe Ely's hellbent determination to get away with it, Jason Ringenberg leads a band no one can accuse of fecklessness, dabbling, revivalism, or undue irony. The lyrics strain against their biblical poetry at times, but anyone who hopes to take a popsicle into a disco is in no immediate danger of expiring of pretentiousness." Fervor also attracted much attention for its groundbreaking cover of Bob Dylan's "Absolutely Sweet Marie." A song which originally appeared on Dylan's Blonde on Blonde in 1966, the Scorchers' version did not originally appear on Fervor but, newly recorded by Manning, was added as a bonus track to Fervor, as reissued on the EMI label.Fervor earned critical praise, placing at No. 3 on The Village Voice's Pazz & Jop Critics Poll for 1983.

 Lost & Found and Still Standing  
The Scorchers quickly followed Fervor with two full-length LP's: Lost & Found produced by Terry Manning, and Still Standing produced by Tom Werman.

Both albums were critically acclaimed (particularly Lost & Found which placed at No. 22 on the Pazz & Jop for 1985), but neither achieved any chart success. Pre-dating country music's popular neotraditionalist movement of the late 1980s and early 1990s, the Scorchers were unable to obtain substantial airplay on either rock radio or country radio, as mainstream rock stations considered them "too country" while mainstream country stations considered them "too rock."

In 1987, the band toured Australia during the Still Standing 1987 Tour and the band were watched by Angus and Malcolm Young of AC/DC at the St. George Sailing Club during this tour. 1987 was also the year that EMI dropped the Scorchers from its label, and Jeff Johnson left the band and was replaced by Ken Fox.

 Thunder and Fire and disbandment 
After a three-year "fallow period," the Scorchers released a third LP, Thunder and Fire, which was more hard-rock. Reviews were mixed and sales were disappointing. "The songs were more metal-influenced," according to the band's website, "as Warner [Hodges] had a big hand in the production. Then Perry Baggs was diagnosed with diabetes during a tour in 1990 and Hodges and Ringenberg were notified that he could not continue to perform. As Hodges stated later, 'we didn't break up, we fell apart.'"

After the Scorchers disbanded, Ringenberg turned to country-oriented solo work, Hodges moved to Los Angeles to work in the video business, Johnson moved to Atlanta to work in the auto and motorcycle repair business, Baggs remained in Nashville, working on Christian music projects, and Fox joined The Fleshtones.

Compact disc retrospective
A few years later, EMI Records hired Jimmy Guterman to compile a compact disc retrospective of the Scorchers' music. A single compact disc containing 22 tracks, Are You Ready for the Country?: The Essential Jason and the Scorchers, Volume 1 was issued in the fall of 1992, including all of Fervor, Lost and Found, and four rarities. (Reportedly, plans for a second volume never materialized.) Jon Brant played on two songs recorded live in 1988 on this compilation. It would fall out-of-print years later, replaced by a shorter compilation that excluded all of the rarities, but it helped introduce the Scorchers to a new generation of listeners who were experiencing a different musical landscape.

1990s reunion
According to the band's website, around this time "Jeff [Johnson] bought a copy of Essential Jason and the Scorchers, Volume 1...He liked it and decided to try to re-unite the band." Johnson contacted Hodges first, who had not played guitar in roughly a year. Hodges hung up on Johnson after hearing him suggest a reunion, but Johnson called six more times that same night. Eventually, Johnson tried Ringenberg, calling him at four in the morning "until Jason agreed to do it." Hodges eventually agreed to a reunion as well, "with his rationale being 'Okay, I won't be the bad guy.'" Baggs also agreed to the reunion, and with the original Scorchers together again, the group began touring in 1993.

The reunion shows were a critical and commercial success, eventually extending into 1994. As a part of the agreement to tour, no songs from Thunder and Fire were played on this tour, as Johnson was not a member of the band at the time it was recorded.  A demo tape of new recordings were also made that year, and the band secured a new contract with Mammoth Records in Chapel Hill, North Carolina. The band then released a new album in 1995, titled A Blazing Grace, which returned them to their original sound. The Scorchers released another new record, Clear Impetuous Morning, in 1996.

In 1997, Jeff Johnson amicably departed from the band, wishing to be with his wife and essentially retiring from the music business; he was replaced by Kenny Ames, of Fredericksburg, Virginia. A live album, Midnight Roads and Stages Seen, was recorded that November and later released in May 1998.

Independent releases
In 1999, Walt Disney Records folded Mammoth Records, two years after buying them out, leaving the Scorchers without a label. Since then, the band independently released a live concert from 1985 on Ringenberg's own homemade label, Courageous Chicken Records. Titled Rock on Germany, it was released in 2001.

In 2002, Courageous Chicken Records released Wildfires and Misfires: Two Decades of Outtakes and Rarities, which contained much previously unreleased material from throughout the band's history.

Reunion and release of Halcyon Times
Due to the success of concerts performed in the U.S. and throughout Europe, Jason and the Scorchers briefly reunited with original members, Jason Ringenberg and Warner Hodges in 2010. Bassist Al Collins and drummer Pontus Snibb were added to the band. They then toured in support of the Jason and the Scorchers album, Halcyon Times, which was released on March 2, 2010. One of the lead tracks on the record, "Golden Days" was written by Ringenberg with two friends from the British rock band, The Wildhearts. Although Ringenberg does not consider it autobiographical, it is his favorite, he states. The lyrics reflect a rocker who grows up and continues to perform even with a family.

Recent years
Drummer Perry Baggs died on 12 July 2012 from diabetes at the age of 50.

Later activities

Ringenberg now performs as Farmer Jason, playing children's music. He also performs solo; playing his own material and some of the Scorchers' classics. In June 2007 Jason & the Scorchers reunited for a Perry Baggs- Benefit- Show in Nashville at Exit/In. They also played one single European- gig in Spain in September of the same year.

The band performed for several shows in Scandinavia and Britain in May 2008. This coincided with a couple of solo shows from Ringenberg, Farmer Jason, and Warner E. Hodges solo shows. There was also a US show at the Flood City Music Festival in Johnstown, Pennsylvania on Labor Day weekend, in 2008. Warner E. Hodges is a full-time member of Dan Baird & Homemade Sin. They toured through Europe in October 2007, and released a new Homemade Sin album in May 2008, on the  Jerkin Crocus record label.

In 2007. Warner E Hodges, Kenny Ames and Fenner Castner played four UK shows under the name Ginger and The Scorchers, with Wildhearts frontman Ginger on vocals. In September 2010, Ringenberg reunited with his Shakespeare's Riot bandmates Gary Gibula and Tom Miller for brief performances at a coffeehouse and an outdoor pavilion in Carbondale, Illinois.

Former drummer and songwriter Perry Baggs became an archivist at The Tennessean where he was employed for 17 years. He also played bass guitar with the Scottsboro First Baptist Church Praise Band. He died at his home on July 12, 2012, following a 22-year battle with diabetes. He was working on a gospel album Hymns for Him at the time.

Awards
In 2008, Jason and the Scorchers received the Americana Music Association's Lifetime Achievement Award in the Performance Category.  The band performed during the Annual Awards Show at Nashville's famed Ryman Auditorium. Bassist Jeff Johnson participated at this event, the first time that all four of the original band members played together on stage since January 19, 1997, when the Scorchers played Club Zydeco in Birmingham, Alabama. Guitarist Warner Hodges and Jason Ringenberg led a modified version of the Scorchers through a full set at the Mercy Lounge in Nashville after the Americana awards.

Discography
Jason & the ScorchersReckless Country Soul EP (1982)Fervor EP (1983)Lost & Found (1985)Still Standing (1986)Thunder and Fire (1989)Essential Jason & the Scorchers - Are You Ready For The Country? (1992)A Blazing Grace (1995)Both Sides of the Line (1996)Clear Impetuous Morning (1996)Reckless Country Soul (1998)Midnight Roads & Stages Seen (1998)Rock on Germany (2001)Wildfires and Misfires (2001)Still Standing (2002) - Re-releaseLost And Found/Fervor (2008)Halcyon Times (2010)

Solo projectsSiren All is Forgiven (1989) - Jon Brant bandOne Foot in the Honky Tonk (1992) - Jason Ringenberg soloA Pocketful of Soul (2000) - Jason Ringenberg soloAll Over Creation (2002) - Jason Ringenberg soloDisciples of Loud (2003) - Warner Hodges soloA Day At The Farm With Farmer Jason (2003) - Farmer JasonEmpire Builders (2004) - Jason Ringenberg soloRockin' In The Forest With Farmer Jason (2006) - Farmer JasonBest Tracks & Side Tracks 1979 - 2007 (2007) - Jason Ringenberg SoloCenterline (2008) Warner E. Hodges soloGunslinger (2014) Warner E. Hodges soloPreachin' the Gospel (2015) Warner E. Hodges solo & The Disciples of LoudRight Back Where I Started (2017) - Warner E. Hodges soloStand Tall (2019) Jason RingenbergThe Roots of Stand Tall (2020) Jason RingenbergRhinestoned'' (2021) Jason Ringenberg

References

External links
Jason Ringenberg Official Site
Review of Halcyon Times at Americana-UK

 
 

 

American alternative country groups
Punk rock groups from Tennessee
Cowpunk musical groups
Musical groups established in 1981
EMI Records artists
Americana music groups